2021 in women's road cycling is about the 2021 women's bicycle races ruled by the UCI and the 2021 UCI Women's Teams.

Olympic Games

World Championships

UCI Women's WorldTour

Single day races (1.Pro, 1.1 and 1.2)

Stage races (2.Pro, 2.1 and 2.2)

Junior races

Continental Championships

Teams

References

 

Women's road cycling by year